Robert Wilson Jr. (March 8, 1926 – August 26, 2014) was an American professional basketball player. He played for the Milwaukee Hawks in the National Basketball Association during 1951–52 after a collegiate career at West Virginia State University.

References

1926 births
2014 deaths
American men's basketball players
Basketball players from West Virginia
Centers (basketball)
Harlem Globetrotters players
Milwaukee Hawks players
Sportspeople from Clarksburg, West Virginia
Undrafted National Basketball Association players
West Virginia State Yellow Jackets men's basketball players